St Mary's Church is a Catholic church in Vau i Dejës, Shkodër, Albania. It was built in the 12th century and destroyed in 1969. The building was listed as a culture monument of Albania.

History 
The church was built in the 12th century. It was the place where the national hero Gjergj Kastriot Skenderbeg married.

It was blown up on May 30, 1969, on the order of Fadil Ymeri. Gani Stratizmiri filed a lawsuit with the prosecutor, because at the time, it had been a culture monument for about 20 years, and it was carrying a sign that it protected by the state. Prosecutor justified the perpetrators on the grounds that they acted without knowing that the church was a culture monument.

Current status 

The church has been reconstructed near the old church ruins. The church is illustrated on the 1000 lek currency note in 1996:

References 
 

Roman Catholic churches in Shkodër
Destroyed churches